LaRon Bennett (born November 25, 1982) is an American former athlete who competed in sprints and hurdles.

A native of Brunswick, Georgia, Bennett attended Glynn Academy and the University of Georgia. He was a captain and three-time All-American on the University of Georgia's track team. His specialist event was the 400 meters hurdles.

Bennett won gold in the 400 meters hurdles at the 2007 NACAC Championships and bronze at the 2007 Pan American Games, where he was also a member of the silver medal-winning 4 x 400 meters relay team.

In 2008, Bennett qualified to compete in hurdles at the IAAF World Athletics Final in Stuttgart.

Bennett finished sixth in the 400 meters hurdles at the 2010 USA Track and Field Championships.

References

External links
LaRon Bennett at World Athletics

1982 births
Living people
American male sprinters
American male hurdlers
Pan American Games medalists in athletics (track and field)
Pan American Games silver medalists for the United States
Pan American Games bronze medalists for the United States
Athletes (track and field) at the 2007 Pan American Games
Medalists at the 2007 Pan American Games
People from Brunswick, Georgia
Georgia Bulldogs track and field athletes
Track and field athletes from Georgia (U.S. state)